Nilbar Güreş (born 1977 Itanbul) is a Turkish artist who lives and works in Vienna, Austria. 

She attended Marmara University, İstanbul and the Academy of Fine Arts, Vienna.

In her works, Güreş explores the female identity, the role of women, the relations between women and their homes and public spaces, as well as, the relation between women. She also focuses on the image of Muslim women in Europe. 

She has exhibited internationally including at the 20th Biennale of Sydney, the SeMA Biennale Mediacity, Seoul, and the 6th Berlin Biennale.

References

External links 
images of Gures' work on MutualArt

1977 births
Living people
Austrian people of Turkish descent
Austrian women sculptors
Turkish women sculptors
Turkish emigrants to Austria
21st-century Turkish women artists
21st-century Turkish sculptors
21st-century Austrian sculptors
21st-century Austrian women artists